Events from the year 1784 in Sweden

Incumbents
 Monarch – Gustav III

Events

 
 
 1 July - Alliance treaty between Sweden and France: Sweden are given Saint-Barthélemy as a colony. 
 
 August - Gustav III returns to Sweden. 
 - Vänersborg Church is inaugurated. 
 - The Illis Quorum is created.  
 - Inauguration of the Stenborg Theatre.

Births

 March 24 - Johan Gabriel Richert, jurist  (died 1864)
 21 August - Charlotta Berger, writer (died 1852)
 23 August  - Henriette Löfman, composer (died 1836)
 31 August  - Jeanette Wässelius, opera singer (died 1853)
 15 October - Hans Olof Holmström, bishop (died 1855)
 17 November – Julia Nyberg, poet (died 1854)
 21 November - Gustaf Wilhelm Finnberg, painter (died 1833)

Deaths

 14 February – Charlotta Löfgren, poet (born 1720)
 
 12 March  - Henrik af Trolle, commander  (born 1730)
 
 18 September - Georg Haupt, cabinet maker  (born 1741)
 Brita Laurelia, publicist, book printer, and poet (born 1712)
 Helena Ehrenmalm, landowner  (born 1730)

References

 
Years of the 18th century in Sweden
Sweden